The following is a list of entomological journals and magazines:

References

 
Lists of academic journals
Zoology-related lists
Entomology journals